Charlotte Werndl is an Austrian philosopher. She holds a chair in logic and philosophy of science at the University of Salzburg and a visiting professorship at the London School of Economics. Werndl is known for her works on philosophy of science and is a winner of Cushing Memorial Prize in History and Philosophy of Physics (2011).

Career
Werndl received her doctoral degree from the University of Cambridge. Before teaching at the University of Salzburg, she was an associate professor at the London School of Economics. Previously, she was a junior research fellow at the Queen's College, University of Oxford.

She is an editor of the Review of Symbolic Logic and an associate editor of Philosophy of Science. She is also a member of the council of the DLMPST (International Union of History and Philosophy of Science).

See also
Chaos theory
Determinism

References

External links
 Personal website

Philosophers of science
Philosophy academics
Living people
Alumni of the University of Cambridge
Year of birth missing (living people)
Academic staff of the University of Salzburg
Austrian women philosophers
21st-century Austrian philosophers